Julia Phillips (born February 4, 1988) is an American author. Her book Disappearing Earth was a finalist for the 2019 National Book Award for Fiction.

Early life and education
Phillips attended Montclair High School and earned her Bachelor of Arts degree in English from Barnard College. She spent a semester of college abroad in Moscow and volunteered at the Crime Victims Treatment Center.

Career
After graduating from college, Phillips earned a Fulbright Program grant allowing her to conduct research in Russia regarding how foreign investment and tourism have affected the Kamchatka Peninsula. She also wrote blog posts for The Moscow Times. During her time in Kamchatka, she began exploring the theme of what everyday harm or hurt against women looks like. She did not wish to pursue the narrative of trauma, but rather the everyday living experiences of women. This eventually led to the publication of her debut novel Disappearing Earth in 2019, which was shortlisted for the 2019 National Book Award for Fiction. The book, which was based on the fictional kidnapping of two girls in the Kamchatka Peninsula, was also named one of The New York Times Top 10 Best Books of 2019.

References

1989 births
Living people
Montclair High School (New Jersey) alumni
People from Montclair, New Jersey
Writers from New Jersey
Barnard College alumni
American women novelists
21st-century American novelists
21st-century American women writers